Gabriele Schor, born in Vienna in 1961, is an Austrian writer, art critic and curator. She is a specialist of the feminist avantgarde of the 1970s.

Biography 
Gabriele Schor studied philosophy in Vienna and art history in San Diego. The subject of her doctorate is the sculptor Alberto Giacometti. She worked for the Tate Gallery in London. In 1996, she curated the exhibition on Barnett Newman at the Staatsgalerie Stuttgart and at the Albertina in Vienna. She worked as a correspondent and art critic for the Neue Zürcher Zeitung in Vienna for seven years.

She is a professor of modern art and art history at the University of Graz, the University of Salzburg and the University of Vienna. In 2004, Gabriele Schor founded and directed the Verbund Collection in Vienna, focusing on the feminist avantgarde of the 1970s.

Gabriele Schor introduces the "feminist avantgarde" expression and theme into the history of art to highlight the achievements of the pioneering artists of the seventies. She has published numerous monographs on feminist artists. In January 2012, she published a catalog on the early work of Cindy Sherman.

The Feminist Avantgarde 
Gabriele Schor shows the importance of the feminist avantgarde of the 1970s in the history of art. Female artists claim their position as artists and their recognition by the art world. They also claim their position and recognition in society. They advocate self-determination and the reappropriation of the image of women in an artistic world dominated by men. They are the expression and reflection of a movement that challenges female role models and the social assignments of women in society.

Female artists take on new media such as photography, experimental film, video art, performance and action, collage and installations. They come together for performative actions and work together to organize their own exhibitions. Artists of the feminist avant-garde question and challenge the traditional image and role of women. They question art and society, the vision of women. They propose new images with which women can identify. They mark a break in the history of art. The themes addressed are the roles of women as mothers, housewives, wives, female sexuality and appropriation of the body, violence against women. They also take up political issues such as the Vietnam War.

In 2019, the exhibition in Barcelona at the Center for Contemporary Culture links the concerns of the feminist avantgarde of the 1970s and the current movement with Catalan artists such as Eugenia Balcells, Eulalia Grau, Fine Miralles Nobell and Angels Ribé.

International exhibitions 

 Héros je joins avec l'eau, Sammlung Verbund, MAK Museum of Applied Arts, Vienna, 2007
 L'avant-garde féministe des années 1970
 Galleria Nazionale d'Arte Moderna, Roma, 2010
 Círculo de Bellas Artes, Madrid, 2013
 BOZAR, Bruxelles, 2014
 Mjellby Art Museum, Sweden, 2014
 Hamburger Kunsthalle, Hamburg, 2015
 The Photographer's Gallery, London, 2016-2017
 ZKM Center for Art and Media Karlsruhe, Karlsruhe, 2017-2018
 The Brno House of Arts, Brno, 2018-2019
 Centre de Cultura Contemporània de Barcelona, Barcelona, 2019
 Birgit Jürgenssen, First retrospective, Sammlung Verbund, Vienna, 2010
 Cindy Sherman. The first works 1975–1977, Geneva Center of Photography, Geneva, 2012
 Francesca Woodman / Birgit Jürgenssen, Works by SAMMLUNG VERBUND, Art Merano, Italy, 2015

National Exhibitions 

 Double Face, Works by SAMMLUNG VERBUND, Vienna, 2008
 Immeubles, Works by SAMMLUNG VERBUND, Vienna, 2008
 Prêt Nguyen – Principe Zartgefühl, Works by SAMMLUNG VERBUND, Vienna, 2011
 Espaces ouverts | lieux secrets, Works by SAMMLUNG VERBUND, Vienna, 2013
 Fon monde privé , Works by SAMMLUNG VERBUND, Vienna, 2014
 Renate Bertlmann. Maître Ergo Sum, Works by SAMMLUNG VERBUND, Vienna, 2016
 Louise Lawler, ELLE EST ICI, Works by SAMMLUNG VERBUND, Vienna, 2018–2019

Books 

 Barnett Newman Die Druckgraphik 1961–1969, with Ulrike Gauss, Hatje Cantz Verlag, Ostfildern, 1996, 
Héros je joins avec l'eau, Art of the SAMMLUNG VERBUND, Vienna, Hatje Cantz Verlag, Ostfildern, 2007, 
Birgit Jürgenssen, collection Verbund, with Abigail Solomon-Godeau, Vienna, Hatje Cantz Verlag, Ostfildern, 2009, 
Donna: Avanguardia Femminista Negli Anni '70 dalla, collection Verbund, Vienna, Mondadori Elected, Milan, 2010, 
Birgit Jürgenssen, with Heike Eipeldauer, Prestel, Munich, 2011, 
Cindy Sherman,The first works 1975–1977, Hatje Cantz Verlag, Ostfildern, 2012, 
Open spaces, secret spaces, Works of the SAMMLUNG VERBUND, Vienna, Salzburg Museum of Modernity Mönchsberg Verlag, 2013, 
Francesca Woodman, with Elisabeth Bronfen, Works of the SAMMLUNG VERBUND, King Bookstore, Cologne, 2014, 
The feminist avantgarde, Art of the 70's of the SAMMLUNG VERBUND, Vienna, Prestel Verlag, Munich, 2015, 
Renate Bertlmann. Works 1969-2016, with Jessica Morgan, A Subversive Political Program Prestel Verlag, Munich, 2016, 
Espaces ouverts, espaces secrets, Works of the SAMMLUNG VERBUN, Bozar Books & Collection Verbund, Vienna, 2016, 
The feminist avant-garde, the art of the seventies, Works of the SAMMLUNG VERBUND, Vienna, Prestel Verlag, Munich, 2016, 
Louise Lawler, works by Louise Lawler acquired by the VERBUND COLLECTION, Vienna & Others, Walter König, Cologne, 2018,

Notes and references 

1961 births
Living people
Austrian writers
Writers from Vienna
Feminist artists